This is a list of positions filled by presidential appointment with Senate confirmation. Under the Appointments Clause of the United States Constitution and law of the United States, certain federal positions appointed by the president of the United States require confirmation (advice and consent) of the United States Senate.

These "PAS" (Presidential Appointment needing Senate confirmation)  positions, as well as other types of federal government positions, are published in the United States Government Policy and Supporting Positions (Plum Book), which is released after each United States presidential election. A 2012 Congressional Research Service study estimated that approximately 1200–1400 positions require Senate confirmation.

Committee on Agriculture, Nutrition and Forestry

Department of Agriculture 
 Secretary of Agriculture
 Deputy Secretary of Agriculture
 Under Secretary of Agriculture for Farm Production and Conservation
 Under Secretary of Agriculture for Food, Nutrition, and Consumer Services
 Under Secretary of Agriculture for Food Safety
 Under Secretary of Agriculture for Marketing and Regulatory Programs
 Under Secretary of Agriculture for Natural Resources and Environment
 Under Secretary of Agriculture for Research, Education, and Economics
 Under Secretary of Agriculture for Rural Development
 Under Secretary of Agriculture for Trade and Foreign Agricultural Affairs
 Assistant Secretary of Agriculture for Congressional Relations
 Assistant Secretary of Agriculture for Civil Rights
 General Counsel
 Chief Financial Officer
 Inspector General

Independent agencies 
 5 Commissioners of the Commodity Futures Trading Commission (political balance required; five-year term of office; chair, who must first be confirmed as a commissioner, also needs to be confirmed)
 3 Members of the Farm Credit Administration (political balance required; six-year term of office)

Committee on Armed Services

Department of Defense 
 Military Officers (commissions and promotions) – Officers receive a commission assigning them to the officer corps from the President (with the consent of the Senate). Promotions of all commissioned military officers are also commissioned by the President (with the consent of the Senate).

Office of the Secretary of Defense 
 Secretary of Defense
 Deputy Secretary of Defense
 General Counsel of the Department of Defense
 Inspector General of the Department of Defense
 Assistant Secretary of Defense for Legislative Affairs
 Chief Information Officer (New Position as of the 116th Congress)
 Under Secretary of Defense for Acquisition and Sustainment
 Deputy Under Secretary of Defense for Acquisition and Sustainment
 Assistant Secretary of Defense for Acquisition
 Assistant Secretary of Defense for Sustainment
 Assistant Secretary of Defense for Nuclear, Chemical and Biological Defense Programs
 Under Secretary of Defense(Comptroller)/Chief Financial Officer of the Department of Defense
 Deputy Under Secretary of Defense (Comptroller)
 Under Secretary of Defense for Intelligence and Security
 Deputy Under Secretary of Defense for Intelligence and Security
 Under Secretary of Defense for Personnel and Readiness
 Deputy Under Secretary of Defense for Personnel and Readiness
 Assistant Secretary of Defense for Health Affairs
 9 Members of the Uniformed Services University of the Health Sciences Board of Regents (six-year terms of office)
 Assistant Secretary of Defense for Manpower and Reserve Affairs
 Assistant Secretary of Defense for Readiness
 Under Secretary of Defense for Policy
 Deputy Under Secretary of Defense for Policy
 Assistant Secretary of Defense for Indo-Pacific Security Affairs
 Assistant Secretary of Defense for Homeland Defense and Global Security
 Assistant Secretary of Defense for Strategy, Plans, and Capabilities
 Assistant Secretary of Defense for Space Policy (announced October 30, 2020)
 Assistant Secretary of Defense for International Security Affairs
 Assistant Secretary of Defense for Special Operations and Low-Intensity Conflict
 Under Secretary of Defense for Research and Engineering (New Position as of late 2017)
 Deputy Under Secretary of Defense for Research and Engineering (New Position as of January 2018)
 Assistant Secretary of Defense for Energy, Installations, and Environment

Department of the Air Force 
 Secretary
 Under Secretary
 Assistant Secretary for Acquisition
 Assistant Secretary for Financial Management and Comptroller
 Assistant Secretary for Manpower and Reserve Affairs
 Assistant Secretary for Installations, Environment, and Logistics
 General Counsel
 Chief of Staff (four-year term of office)

Department of the Army 
 Secretary
 Under Secretary
 Assistant Secretary for Acquisition, Logistics, and Technology
 Assistant Secretary for Civil Works
 Assistant Secretary for Financial Management and Comptroller
 Assistant Secretary for Installations, Energy and Environment
 Assistant Secretary for Manpower and Reserve Affairs
 General Counsel
 Chief of Staff (four-year term of office)

Department of the Navy 
 Secretary
 Under Secretary
 Assistant Secretary for Financial Management and Comptroller
 Assistant Secretary for Installations and Environment
 Assistant Secretary for Manpower and Reserve Affairs
 Assistant Secretary for Research, Development, and Acquisition
 General Counsel
 Chief of Naval Operations (four-year term of office)
 Commandant of the Marine Corps (four-year term of office)

Joint Chiefs of Staff
 Chairman of the Joint Chiefs of Staff (four-year term of office)
 Vice Chairman of the Joint Chiefs of Staff (four-year term of office)

Department of Energy 
 Under Secretary of Energy for Nuclear Security/Administrator of the National Nuclear Security Administration
 Principal Deputy Administrator - National Nuclear Security Administration
 Deputy Administrator for Defense Programs - National Nuclear Security Administration
 Deputy Administrator for Defense Nuclear Nonproliferation - National Nuclear Security Administration
 Assistant Secretary for Environmental Management

Independent agencies 
 5 Members of the Defense Nuclear Facilities Safety Board (political balance required; five-year terms of office)

Judicial branch 
 Five Judges of the United States Court of Appeals for the Armed Forces (political balance required; 15-year terms of office)

Committee on Banking, Housing, and Urban Affairs

Department of Commerce 
 Under Secretary for Export Administration
 Under Secretary for International Trade
 Assistant Secretary for Export Administration
 Assistant Secretary for Export Enforcement
 Assistant Secretary for Trade Promotion/Director General of the U.S. and Foreign Commercial Service

Department of Housing and Urban Development 
 Secretary
 Deputy Secretary
 Assistant Secretary for Administration
 Assistant Secretary for Community Planning and Development
 Assistant Secretary for Congressional and Intergovernmental Relations
 Assistant Secretary for Fair Housing and Equal Opportunity
 Assistant Secretary for Housing/Federal Housing Commissioner
 Assistant Secretary for Policy Development and Research
 Assistant Secretary for Public and Indian Housing
 Chief Financial Officer
 Director – Office of Federal Housing Enterprise Oversight (five-year term)
 General Counsel
 Inspector General
 President – Government National Mortgage Association (Ginnie Mae)

Department of Transportation 
 Administrator – Federal Transit Administration

Department of the Treasury 
 Under Secretary for Terrorism and Financial Intelligence
 Assistant Secretary for Financial Institutions
 Assistant Secretary for Terrorist Financing
 Comptroller of the Currency (five-year term of office)
 Director of the Mint (five-year term of office)
 Director of the Office of Financial Research (six-year term of office)

Executive Office of the President 
 Chair of the Council of Economic Advisers

Independent agencies 
 Director of the Consumer Financial Protection Bureau (CFPB)
 5 Members of the Export-Import Bank of the United States (political balance required; four-year terms of office — Chair, who first must be confirmed as a member, also needs to be confirmed.)
 Inspector General of the Export-Import Bank of the United States
 3 Members of the Federal Deposit Insurance Corporation (political balance required; six-year terms of office — Chair and vice chair, who first must be confirmed as members, also need to be confirmed.)
 Inspector General of the Federal Deposit Insurance Corporation
 Director of the Federal Housing Finance Agency (four-year terms of office)
 7 Governors of the Federal Reserve System (14-year terms of office — Chair and vice chair, who first must be confirmed as governors, also need to be confirmed for four-year terms in those offices.)
 3 Members of the National Credit Union Administration (political balance required; six-year terms of office)
 5 Commissioners of the Securities and Exchange Commission (political balance required; five-year terms of office)
 3 Directors of the National Cooperative Bank (of 15 total; three-year terms of office)
 15 to 21 Directors of the National Institute of Building Sciences (three-year terms of office)
 5 Directors of the Securities Investor Protection Corporation (of 7 total; three-year terms of office)

Committee on the Budget

Executive Office of the President 
Office of Management and Budget
 Director
 Deputy Director

Committee on Commerce, Science, and Transportation

Department of Commerce 
 Secretary of Commerce
 Deputy Secretary of Commerce
 Assistant Secretary of Commerce for Legislative and Intergovernmental Affairs
 Chief Financial Officer and Assistant Secretary of Commerce for Administration
 General Counsel of the Department of Commerce
 Under Secretary of Commerce for Industry and Security
 Under Secretary of Commerce for Economic Affairs
 Director of the Census
 Under Secretary of Commerce for International Trade
 Assistant Secretary for Import Administration
 Assistant Secretary for Market Access and Compliance
 Assistant Secretary for Manufacturing and Services
 Assistant Secretary of Commerce and Director General of the United States Foreign Commercial Service
 Under Secretary for Oceans and Atmosphere/Administrator of the National Oceanic and Atmospheric Administration
 Assistant Secretary for Environmental Observation and Prediction
 Assistant Secretary for Conservation and Management
 Chief Scientist
 Assistant Secretary for Communications and Information
 Under Secretary for Standards and Technology/Director of the National Institute of Standards and Technology
 Under Secretary for Intellectual Property/Director, U.S. Patent and Trademark Office
 Inspector General

Department of Homeland Security 
 Secretary
 Under Secretary for Science and Technology
 Administrator of the Transportation Security Administration
 Commandant of the United States Coast Guard
 United States Coast Guard officers (commissions and promotions)

Department of Transportation 
 Secretary
 Deputy Secretary
 Under Secretary for Policy
 Assistant Secretary for Aviation and International Affairs
 Assistant Secretary for Budget and Programs and Chief Financial Officer
 Assistant Secretary for Governmental Affairs
 Assistant Secretary for Transportation Policy
 Administrator – Federal Aviation Administration (five-year term of office)
 Administrator – Federal Motor Carrier Safety Administration
 Administrator – Federal Railroad Administration
 Administrator – Maritime Administration
 Administrator – National Highway Traffic Safety Administration
 Administrator – Pipeline and Hazardous Materials Safety Administration
 Administrator – Research and Innovative Technology Administration
 General Counsel
 Inspector General
 3 Members of the Surface Transportation Board (political balance required; five-year terms of office)

National Aeronautics and Space Administration 
 Administrator of the National Aeronautics and Space Administration
 Deputy Administrator of the National Aeronautics and Space Administration
 Chief Financial Officer of the National Aeronautics and Space Administration
 Inspector General of the National Aeronautics and Space Administration

Executive Office of the President 
Office of Science and Technology Policy
 Director
 Associate Director for Science
 Associate Director for Technology
 Associate Director for National Security & International Affairs
 Associate Director for Energy & Environment

Independent agencies 
 5 Commissioners of the Consumer Product Safety Commission (political balance required; seven-year terms of office; chair, who first must be confirmed as a member, also needs to be confirmed.)
 5 Commissioners of the Federal Communications Commission (political balance required; five-year terms of office)
 5 Commissioners of the Federal Maritime Commission (political balance required; five-year terms of office)
 5 Commissioners of the Federal Trade Commission (political balance required; seven-year terms of office)
 5 Members of the National Transportation Safety Board (political balance required; five-year terms of office - Chair, who first must be confirmed as a member, also needs to be confirmed.)
 Federal Coordinator for Alaska Natural Gas Transportation Projects
 9 Directors of the Corporation for Public Broadcasting (political balance required; six-year terms of office)
 3 Directors of the Metropolitan Washington Airports Authority (six-year terms of office; political balance required)
 7 Members of the Amtrak Reform Board (five-year terms of office)
 5 Members of the Saint Lawrence Seaway Development Corporation Advisory Board (political balance required;indefinite terms of office)

Committee on Energy and Natural Resources

Department of Energy 
 Secretary
 Deputy Secretary
 Under Secretary for Energy and Environment
 Under Secretary for Science
 Administrator – Energy Information Administration
 Assistant Secretary for Congressional and Intergovernmental Affairs
 Assistant Secretary for Electricity Delivery and Energy Reliability – runs the Office of Electricity Delivery and Energy Reliability
 Assistant Secretary for Energy Efficiency and Renewable Energy – runs the Office of Energy Efficiency and Renewable Energy
 Assistant Secretary for Environmental Management – runs the Office of Environmental Management
 Assistant Secretary for Fossil Energy – runs the Office of Fossil Energy
 Assistant Secretary for International Affairs and Domestic Policy
 Assistant Secretary for Nuclear Energy – runs the Office of Nuclear Energy
 Chief Financial Officer
 Director – Advanced Research Projects Agency - Energy
 Director – Office of Civilian Radioactive Waste Management
 Director – Office of Economic Impact and Diversity
 Director – Office of Science
 General Counsel
 Inspector General
 5 Commissioners of the Federal Energy Regulatory Commission (political balance required; five-year terms of office)

Department of the Interior 
 Secretary
 Deputy Secretary
 Assistant Secretary for Fish, Wildlife and Parks
 Assistant Secretary for Land and Minerals Management
 Assistant Secretary for Policy, Management, and Budget and Chief Financial Officer
 Assistant Secretary for Water and Science
 Commissioner – Bureau of Reclamation
 Director – Bureau of Land Management
 Director – National Park Service
 Director – Office of Surface Mining Reclamation and Enforcement
 Director – United States Geological Survey
 Inspector General
 Solicitor
 Federal Coordinator for Alaska Natural Gas Transportation Projects

Committee on Environment and Public Works

Department of Commerce 
 Assistant Secretary for Economic Development

Department of Defense 
 Assistant Secretary of the Army (Civil Works)

Department of the Interior 
 Assistant Secretary for Fish, Wildlife and Parks
 Director – United States Fish and Wildlife Service

Department of Transportation 
 Administrator – Federal Highway Administration

Executive Office of the President 
 Chair of the Council on Environmental Quality

Environmental Protection Agency 
 Administrator
 Deputy Administrator
 Assistant Administrator
 Assistant Administrator for Administration and Resources Management
 Assistant Administrator for Air and Radiation
 Assistant Administrator for Enforcement and Compliance Assurance
 Assistant Administrator for Environmental Information
 Assistant Administrator for International Affairs
 Assistant Administrator for Prevention, Pesticides, and Toxic Substances
 Assistant Administrator for Research and Development
 Assistant Administrator for Solid Waste and Emergency Response
 Assistant Administrator for Water
 Chief Financial Officer
 General Counsel
 Inspector General

Other independent agencies 
 Federal Cochair of the Appalachian Regional Commission
 5 Members of the Chemical Safety and Hazard Investigation Board (five-year terms of office – Chair, who first must be confirmed as a member, also needs to be confirmed.)
 Federal Cochair of the Delta Regional Authority
 5 Commissioners of the Nuclear Regulatory Commission (political balance required; five-year terms of office)
 Inspector General of the Nuclear Regulatory Commission
 9 Directors of the Tennessee Valley Authority (five-year terms of office)
 Inspector General of the Tennessee Valley Authority
 9 Trustees of the Morris K. Udall Scholarship and Excellence in National Environmental Policy Foundation (political balance required; six-year terms of office)

Committee on Finance

Department of Commerce 
 Under Secretary for International Trade
 Assistant Secretary for Import Administration
 Assistant Secretary for Market Access and Compliance

Department of Health and Human Services 
 Secretary
 Deputy Secretary
 Administrator – Centers for Medicare and Medicaid Services
 Assistant Secretary for Resources and Technology
 Chief financial officer
 Assistant Secretary of the Administration for Children and Families
Assistant Secretary for Health
 Assistant Secretary for Legislation
 Assistant Secretary for Planning and Evaluation
 Commissioner – Administration of Children, Youth, and Families
 General Counsel
 Inspector General

Department of Homeland Security 
 Secretary
 Commissioner of United States Customs and Border Protection

Department of the Treasury 
 Secretary
 Deputy Secretary
 Under Secretary for Domestic Finance
 Under Secretary for International Affairs
 Under Secretary for Terrorism and Financial Intelligence
 Assistant Secretary for Economic Policy
 Assistant Secretary for Financial Markets
 Assistant Secretary (Deputy Under Secretary) for International Affairs
 Assistant Secretary (Deputy Under Secretary) for Legislative Affairs
 Assistant Secretary for Tax Policy
 Chief Financial Officer
 Director — Policy Planning
 Chief Counsel — Internal Revenue Service/Assistant General Counsel for Tax
 Commissioner — Internal Revenue Service (five-year terms of office)
 General Counsel
 Inspector General
 Inspector General — Tax Administration

Executive Office of the President 
Office of the United States Trade Representative
 U.S. Trade Representative
 3 Deputy U.S. Trade Representatives
 Chief Agricultural Negotiator
 Chief Intellectual Property Negotiator

Other independent agencies 
 Director of the Pension Benefit Guaranty Corporation
 Commissioner of the Social Security Administration (six-year term of office)
 Deputy Commissioner of the Social Security Administration (six-year term of office)
 Inspector General of the Social Security Administration
 6 Commissioners of the United States International Trade Commission (political balance required; nine-year terms of office)
 2 Trustees of the Federal Hospital Insurance Trust Fund (of 6 total; political balance required; four-year terms of office)
 2 Trustees of the Federal Old-Age and Survivors Trust Fund and the Disability Insurance Trust Fund (of 6 total; political balance required; four-year terms of office)
 2 Trustees of the Federal Supplementary Medical Insurance Trust Fund, Board of Trustees (of 6 total; political balance required; four-year terms of office)
 6 Members of the Internal Revenue Service Oversight Board (five-year terms of office)
 3 Members of the Social Security Advisory Board (of 7 total; political balance required; six-year terms of office)

Judicial branch 
 19 Judges of the United States Tax Court (15-year terms of office)

Committee on Foreign Relations

Department of State 
 Secretary of State
 Deputy Secretary of State
 Deputy Secretary of State for Management and Resources
 Under Secretary of State for Arms Control and International Security
 Assistant Secretary of State for Arms Control, Verification and Compliance
 Assistant Secretary of State for International Security and Nonproliferation
 Assistant Secretary of State for Political-Military Affairs
 Under Secretary of State for Civilian Security, Democracy, and Human Rights
 Assistant Secretary of State for Conflict and Stabilization Operations
 Assistant Secretary of State for Democracy, Human Rights, and Labor
 Assistant Secretary of State for International Narcotics and Law Enforcement Affairs
 Assistant Secretary of State for Population, Refugees, and Migration
 Coordinator for Counterterrorism, with the rank and status of Ambassador-at-Large
 Ambassador-at-Large for Global Criminal Justice
 Director of the Office to Monitor and Combat Trafficking, with rank of Ambassador-at-Large
 Ambassador-at-Large for International Religious Freedom
 Under Secretary of State for Economic Growth, Energy, and the Environment
 Assistant Secretary of State for Economic and Business Affairs
 Coordinator for Sanctions (new position as of the 117th United States Congress)
 Assistant Secretary for Oceans and International Environmental and Scientific Affairs
 Under Secretary for Management and Chief Financial Officer of the Department of State
 Assistant Secretary for Consular Affairs
 Assistant Secretary for Diplomatic Security
 Director of the Office of Foreign Missions, with rank of Ambassador
 Director General of the Foreign Service and Director of Human Resources
 Under Secretary for Political Affairs
 Assistant Secretary for African Affairs
 Assistant Secretary for East Asian and Pacific Affairs
 Assistant Secretary for European and Eurasian Affairs
 Assistant Secretary for International Organization Affairs
 Assistant Secretary for Near Eastern Affairs
 Assistant Secretary for South and Central Asian Affairs
 Assistant Secretary for Western Hemisphere Affairs
 Under Secretary for Public Diplomacy and Public Affairs
 Assistant Secretary for Educational and Cultural Affairs
Reports directly to the Secretary & Deputy Secretary:
 Assistant Secretary for Intelligence and Research
 Assistant Secretary for Legislative Affairs
 Coordinator of United States Government Activities to Combat HIV/AIDS Globally, with the rank of Ambassador-at-Large
 U.S. Permanent Representative to the Organization of American States
 U.S. Permanent Representative to the North Atlantic Treaty Organization
 Ambassador-at-Large for Global Women's Issues
 Inspector General of the Department of State
 Legal Adviser of the Department of State
 Chief of Protocol of the United States, with rank of Ambassador
 188 Ambassadors
 Foreign Service Officers (commissions and promotions)

United States Mission to the United Nations 
 U.S. Permanent Representative and Chief of Mission to the United Nations
 U.S. Deputy Permanent Representative – United Nations
 U.S. Representative – United Nations Agencies for Food and Agriculture
 U.S. Representative – United Nations Economic and Social Council
 U.S. Alternate Representative – Special Political Affairs in the United Nations
 U.S. Representative – United Nations Management and Reform
 U.S. Representative – European Office of the United Nations (Geneva)
 U.S. Representative – United Nations Office at Vienna (also serves as a representative to the International Atomic Energy Agency)
 U.S. Representative – International Atomic Energy Agency
 U.S. Deputy Representative – International Atomic Energy Agency
 U.S. Representative to sessions of the General Assembly and other United Nations Bodies — numerous positions (terms of office depends on length of session)

United States Agency for International Development 
 Administrator
 Assistant Administrator — Asia and Near East
 Assistant Administrator — Democracy, Conflict, and Humanitarian Assistance
 Assistant Administrator — Economic Growth, Agriculture, and Trade
 Assistant Administrator — Europe and Eurasia
 Assistant Administrator — Global Health
 Assistant Administrator — Latin America and Caribbean
 Assistant Administrator — Legislative and Public Affairs
 Assistant Administrator — Policy and Program Coordination
 Assistant Administrator — Sub-Saharan Africa
 Deputy Administrator
 Inspector General

International Bank for Reconstruction and Development 
 U.S. Executive Director two-year term of office; full-time
 U.S. Alternate Executive Director
 Governor
 Alternate Governor

International Development Association 
 U.S. Executive director for the international Development Association
 U.S. Alternate director for the international Development Association
 Governor for the international Development Association
 Alternate Governor for the international Development Association

International Finance Corporation 
 U.S. Executive director for the International Finance Corporation
 U.S. Alternate Director for the International finance Corporation
 Governor for the International Finance corporation
 Alternate Governor for the International Finance Corporation

Other independent agencies 
 U.S. Executive Director of the European Bank for Reconstruction and Development
 Director of the International Broadcasting Bureau, Broadcasting Board of Governors
 3 Commissioners of the International Joint Commission, United States and Canada
 U.S. Executive Director of the International Monetary Fund (two-year term of office)
 U.S. Alternate Executive Director of the International Monetary Fund (two-year term of office)
 U.S. Executive Director of the Inter-American Development Bank (three-year term of office)
 U.S. Alternate Executive Director of the Inter-American Development Bank (three-year term of office)
 U.S. Alternate Executive Director for the Inter-American Investment Corporation
 Director of the United States Trade and Development Agency
 U.S. Executive Director of the African Development Bank (five-year term of office; full-time)
 Governor and Alternate Governor of the African Development Bank (five-year terms of office; part-time)
 U.S. Executive Director of the Asian Development Bank (full-time)
 Governor and Alternate Governor of the Asian Development Bank (part-time)
 Chief Executive Officer of the Millennium Challenge Corporation (full-time)
 4 Directors of the Millennium Challenge Corporation (of 9 total; part-time; three-year terms of office)
 President/Chief Executive Officer of the Overseas Private Investment Corporation (full-time)
 Executive Vice President of the Overseas Private Investment Corporation (full-time)
 8 Directors of the Overseas Private Investment Corporation (of 15 total; part-time; three-year terms of office)
 Director of the Peace Corps (full-time)
 Deputy Director of the Peace Corps (full-time)
 15 Members of the Peace Corps National Advisory Council (part-time; political balance required; two-year terms of office)
 9 Members of the Advisory Board for Cuba Broadcasting (political balance required; three-year terms of office)
 7 Directors of the African Development Foundation (political balance required; six-year terms of office)
 Governor of the African Development Fund
 Alternate Governor of the African Development Fund
 8 Members of the Broadcasting Board of Governors (of 9 total; political balance required; three-year terms of office)
 9 Directors of the Inter-American Foundation (political balance required; six-year terms of office)
 7 Commissioners of the U.S. Advisory Commission on Public Diplomacy (political balance required; three-year terms of office)

Committee on Health, Education, Labor, and Pensions

Department of Education 
 Secretary
 Deputy Secretary
 Director, Institute of Education Sciences (six-year term of office)
 Under Secretary
 Assistant Secretary for Civil Rights – runs the Office for Civil Rights
 Assistant Secretary for Communications and Outreach – runs the Office of Communications and Outreach
 Assistant Secretary for Elementary and Secondary Education – runs the Office of Elementary and Secondary Education
 Assistant Secretary for Legislation and Congressional Affairs
 Assistant Secretary for Planning, Evaluation and Policy Development – runs the Office of Planning, Evaluation, and Policy Development
 Assistant Secretary for Postsecondary Education – runs the Office of Postsecondary Education
 Assistant Secretary for Special Education and Rehabilitative Services – runs the Office of Special Education and Rehabilitative Services
 Assistant Secretary for Career, Technical and Adult Education – runs the Office of Career, Technical, and Adult Education
 Chief Financial Officer
 Commissioner – Rehabilitation Services Administration
 General Counsel
 Inspector General

Department of Health and Human Services 
 Secretary
 Administrator — Substance Abuse and Mental Health Services Administration
 Assistant Secretary for Aging
 Assistant Secretary for Health
 Assistant Secretary for the Administration of Children and Families
 Commissioner for the Administration of Children, Youth, and Families
 Assistant Secretary for Preparedness and Response
 Commissioner of Food and Drugs
 Director – National Institutes of Health
 Surgeon General (four-year term of office)

Department of Labor 
 Secretary of Labor
 Deputy Secretary of Labor
 Assistant Secretary for Congressional and Intergovernmental Affairs
 Assistant Secretary for Disability Employment Policy
 Assistant Secretary for Employee Benefits Security Administration
 Assistant Secretary for Employment and Training Administration
 Assistant Secretary for Mine Safety and Health Administration
 Assistant Secretary for Occupational Safety and Health Administration
 Assistant Secretary for Policy
 Assistant Secretary for Veterans' Employment and Training Service
 Administrator – Wage and Hour Division
 Chief Financial Officer
 Commissioner – Bureau of Labor Statistics
 Inspector General
 Solicitor

Independent agencies 
 Chief Executive Officer of the Corporation for National and Community Service
 Chief Financial Officer of the Corporation for National and Community Service
 Inspector General of the Corporation for National and Community Service
 5 Commissioners of the Equal Employment Opportunity Commission (political balance required; five-year terms of office)
 General Counsel of the Equal Employment Opportunity Commission (four-year term of office)
 Director of the Federal Mediation and Conciliation Service
 5 Commissioners of the Federal Mine Safety and Health Review Commission (six-year terms of office)
 National Endowment for the Arts – Chair (four-year term of office)
 National Endowment for the Humanities – Chair (four-year term of office)
 Institute of Museum and Library Services – Director (four-year term of office)
 5 Members of the National Labor Relations Board (Political balance is not required, but, by tradition, no more than three members are from the same party; five-year terms of office)
 General Counsel of the National Labor Relations Board (four-year term of office)
 3 Members of the National Mediation Board (political balance required; three-year terms of office)
 Director of the National Science Foundation (six-year term of office)
 Deputy Director of the National Science Foundation
 3 Members of the Occupational Safety and Health Review Commission (six-year terms of office)
 Director of the Pension Benefit Guaranty Corporation
 3 Members of the Railroad Retirement Board (five-year terms of office; chair, who first must be appointed as a member, also needs to be confirmed.)
 Inspector General of the Railroad Retirement Board
 8 Trustees of the Barry M. Goldwater Scholarship and Excellence in Education Foundation (of 13 total; political balance required; six-year terms of office)
 15 Directors of the Corporation for National and Community Service (political balance required; five-year terms of office)
 8 Trustees of the Harry S. Truman Scholarship Foundation (of 13 total; political balance required; six-year terms of office)
 6 Trustees of the James Madison Memorial Fellowship Foundation (of 13 total; political balance required; six-year terms of office)
 11 Directors of the Legal Services Corporation (political balance required; three-year terms of office)
 14 Members of the National Council on the Arts (of 21 total; six-year terms of office)
 26 Members of the National Council on the Humanities (of 27 total; six-year terms of office)
 12 Directors of the United States Institute of Peace (of 15 total; political balance required; four-year terms of office)

Committee on Homeland Security and Governmental Affairs

Department of Commerce 
 Director – Bureau of the Census
 Inspector General

Department of Homeland Security 
 Secretary
 Deputy Secretary
 Under Secretary for Management
 Under Secretary for Science and Technology
 Under Secretary for Strategy, Policy and Plans 
 Director of the Cybersecurity and Infrastructure Security Agency
 Director of the U.S. Immigration and Customs Enforcement
 Administrator of the Federal Emergency Management Agency
 Deputy Administrator of the Federal Emergency Management Agency
 Deputy Administrator of the Federal Emergency Management Agency (Resilience)
 General Counsel
 Chief Financial Officer

Department Inspector Generals 
 Inspector General - Department of Defense
 Inspector General - Department of Education
 Inspector General - Department of Energy
 Inspector General - Department of Health and Human Services
 Inspector General - Department of Housing and Urban Development
 Inspector General - Department of the Interior
 Inspector General - Department of Labor
 Inspector General - Department of Transportation
 Inspector General - Department of the Treasury
 Inspector General - Environmental Protection Agency

Executive Office of the President 
 National Cyber Director (position established April 12, 2021)
Office of Management and Budget
 Director
 Deputy Director
 Deputy Director for Management
 Administrator of the Office of Federal Procurement Policy
 Administrator of the Office of Information and Regulatory Affairs
 Controller of the Office of Federal Financial Management

Office of Personnel Management 
 Director of the Office of Personnel Management (four-year term of office)
 Deputy Director of the Office of Personnel Management
 Inspector General of the Office of Personnel Management

Independent agencies 
 Director of the Court Services and Offender Supervision Agency to the District of Columbia (six-year term of office)
 3 Members of the Federal Labor Relations Authority (political balance required; five-year terms of office)
 General Counsel of the Federal Labor Relations Authority (five-year term of office)
 Administrator of the General Services Administration
 Inspector General of the General Services Administration
 3 Members of the Merit Systems Protection Board (political balance required; seven-year terms of office). The Chair, who first must be confirmed as a member, also needs to be confirmed.
 Archivist of the United States, National Archives and Records Administration
 Director of the Office of Government Ethics (five-year term of office)
 Special Counsel of the Office of Special Counsel (five-year term of office)
 5 Commissioners of the Postal Regulatory Commission (political balance required; six-year terms of office)

 5 Members of Federal Retirement Thrift Investment Board (four-year terms of office)
 Chair of the Special Panel on Appeals (six-year term of office)
 9 Governors of the Board of Governors of the United States Postal Service (political balance required; seven-year terms of office)

Legislative branch 
 Comptroller General of the United States, Government Accountability Office (15-year term of office)
 Deputy Comptroller General of the Government Accountability Office

Judicial branch 
 Chief Judge of the District of Columbia Court of Appeals (15-year term of office)
 9 Judges of the District of Columbia Court of Appeals (15-year terms of office)
 Chief Judge of the Superior Court of the District of Columbia (15-year term of office)
 61 Judges of the Superior Court of the District of Columbia (15-year terms of office)

Committee on Indian Affairs

Department of Health and Human Services 
 Director – Indian Health Service (four-year term of office)
 Commissioner – Administration for Native Americans

Department of the Interior 
 Assistant Secretary – Indian Affairs
 Chair – National Indian Gaming Commission (three-year term of office)
 Special Trustee – American Indians

Select Committee on Intelligence

Department of Justice 
 Assistant Attorney General – National Security Division

Department of State 
 Assistant Secretary of State for Intelligence and Research

Department of the Treasury 
 Assistant Secretary for Intelligence and Analysis

Central Intelligence Agency 
 Director
 General Counsel
 Inspector General

Office of the Director of National Intelligence 
 Director of National Intelligence
 Principal Deputy Director
 Director, National Counterterrorism Center
 Director, National Counterintelligence & Security Center
 General Counsel
 Inspector General of the Intelligence Community

Committee on the Judiciary

Department of Commerce 
 Under Secretary of Commerce for Intellectual Property – United States Patent and Trademark Office

Department of Homeland Security 
 Assistant Secretary – U.S. Immigration and Customs Enforcement
 Director – U.S. Citizenship and Immigration Services

Department of Justice 
 Attorney General
 Solicitor General
 Deputy Attorney General
 Associate Attorney General
 Assistant Attorney General - Antitrust Division
 Assistant Attorney General – Office of Justice Programs
 Assistant Attorney General – Office of Legal Counsel
 Assistant Attorney General – Office of Legal Policy
 Assistant Attorney General – Office of Legislative Affairs
 Assistant Attorney General – Civil Division
 Assistant Attorney General – Civil Rights Division
 Assistant Attorney General – Criminal Division
 Assistant Attorney General – Environment and Natural Resources Division
 Assistant Attorney General – National Security Division
 Assistant Attorney General – Tax Division
 Administrator – Drug Enforcement Administration
 Deputy Administrator – Drug Enforcement Administration
 Director – Bureau of Alcohol, Tobacco, Firearms and Explosives
 Director – Community Relations Service (four-year term of office)
 Director – Federal Bureau of Investigation (10-year term of office)
 Director – Office on Violence Against Women
 Director – United States Marshals Service
 Inspector General
 Special Counsel – Immigration-Related Unfair Employment Practices (four-year term of office)
 93 United States Attorneys (one in each federal judicial district, except that one U.S. Attorney serves for both the Districts of Guam and the Northern Mariana Islands; four-year terms of office)
 94 United States Marshals (one in each federal judicial district; four-year terms of office)
 5 Members of the United States Parole Commission (six-year term of office)
 Chair of the Foreign Claims Settlement Commission (three-year term of office; nominated from among commissioner members)
 2 other Members of the Foreign Claims Settlement Commission (three-year terms of office)

Executive Office of the President 
Office of National Drug Control Policy
 Director of National Drug Control Policy  ("Drug Czar")
 Deputy Director of National Drug Control Policy
 Deputy Director for Demand Reduction
 Deputy Director for Supply Reduction
 Deputy Director for State and Local Affairs

Independent agencies 
 11 Directors of the State Justice Institute (three-year terms of office)

Judicial branch 
 Chief Justice of the United States (life tenure)
 8 Associate Justices of the Supreme Court of the United States (life tenure)
 179 Judges of the United States courts of appeals (life tenure)
 16 Judges of the United States Court of Federal Claims (15-year terms of office)
 9 Judges of the United States Court of International Trade (political balance required; life tenure)
 678 Judges of the United States district courts (Most are life tenure; in total there are 663 permanent judgeships, 11 temporary judgeships, and four territorial court judgeships. In the districts with the 11 temporary judgeships, the seat lapses with the departure of a judge from that district at some particular time specified in statute unless Congress enacts legislation to extend the temporary judgeship or convert it to a permanent judgeship.)
 Chair of the United States Sentencing Commission (six-year term of office; nominated from among commission members)
 3 Vice Chairs of the United States Sentencing Commission (six-year terms of office; designated from among commission members)
 3 other Commissioners of the United States Sentencing Commission (political balance required; six-year terms of office; one of the seven members is also nominated to be the full-time chair of the commission, and two others are designated as full-time vice-chairs)

Committee on Rules and Administration

Independent agencies 
 4 Commissioners of the Election Assistance Commission (four-year terms of office; political balance required)
 6 Commissioners of the Federal Election Commission (six-year terms of office; political balance required)

Legislative branch 
 Architect of the Capitol
 Director – United States Government Publishing Office
 Librarian – Library of Congress

Committee on Small Business and Entrepreneurship

Small Business Administration 
 Administrator
 Deputy Administrator
 Chief Counsel for Advocacy
 Inspector General

Committee on Veterans' Affairs

Department of Labor 
 Assistant Secretary of Labor for Veterans' Employment and Training Service

Department of Veterans Affairs 
 Secretary of Veterans Affairs
 Deputy Secretary of Veterans Affairs
 Under Secretary of Veterans Affairs for Benefits (four-year term of office) – heads Veterans Benefits Administration
 Under Secretary of Veterans Affairs for Health (four-year term of office) – heads Veterans Health Administration
 Under Secretary of Veterans Affairs for Memorial Affairs – heads National Cemetery Administration
 Assistant Secretary of Veterans Affairs for Congressional and Legislative Affairs
 Assistant Secretary of Veterans Affairs for Information and Technology
 Assistant Secretary of Veterans Affairs for Policy and Planning
 Chief Financial Officer
 Chairman of the Board of Veterans' Appeals (six-year term of office)
 General Counsel
 Inspector General

Judicial branch 
 3 to 7 Judges of the United States Court of Appeals for Veterans Claims (15-year terms of office)

Former Senate-confirmed positions
There are a number of positions that required Senate confirmation of appointees in the past, but do not today. The Presidential Appointment Efficiency and Streamlining Act of 2011, signed into law on August 10, 2012, eliminates the requirement of Senate approval for 163 positions, allowing the president alone to appoint persons to these positions: Parts of the act went into effect immediately, while other parts took effect on October 9, 2012, 60 days after enactment.
 Department of Agriculture:
 Assistant Secretary for Administration,
 Administrator of the Rural Utilities Services
 all members of the Board of Directors of the Commodity Credit Corporation (7)
 Department of Commerce:
 Chief Scientist of the National Oceanic and Atmospheric Administration
 Department of Defense:
 All members of the National Security Education Board (6)
 Director of the Selective Service System
 Department of Education:
 Assistant Secretary for Management
 Commissioner for Education Statistics
 Department of Health and Human Services:
 Assistant Secretary for Public Affairs
 Department of Homeland Security:
 Director of the Office for Domestic Preparedness
 Assistant Administrator for Grant Programs, Federal Emergency Management Administration (FEMA)
 Administrator of the U.S. Fire Administration
 Director of the Office of Counternarcotics Enforcement
 Chief Medical Officer
 Assistant Secretary for Health Affairs
 Assistant Secretary for Legislative Affairs
 Assistant Secretary for Public Affairs
 Housing and Urban Development:
 Assistant Secretary for Public Affairs
 Department of Justice:
 Director of the Bureau of Justice Statistics
 Director of the Bureau of Justice Assistance
 Director of the National Institute of Justice
 Administrator of the Office of Juvenile Justice and Delinquency Prevention
 Director of the Office for Victims of Crime
 Department of Labor:
 Assistant Secretary for Administration and Management
 Assistant Secretary for Public Affairs
 Director of the Women's Bureau
 Department of State
 Assistant Secretary for Public Affairs
 Assistant Secretary for Administration
 Department of Transportation:
 Assistant Secretary for Budget and Programs
 Assistant Secretary for Administration
 Deputy Administrator of the Federal Aviation Administration
 Administrator of the Saint Lawrence Seaway Development Corporation
 Department of the Treasury:
 Assistant Secretary for Public Affairs
 Assistant Secretary for Management
 Treasurer of the United States
 Department of Veterans Affairs:
 Assistant Secretary for Management
 Assistant Secretary for Human Resources and Administration
 Assistant Secretary for Public and Intergovernmental Affairs
 Assistant Secretary for Operations, Security, and Preparedness
 Appalachian Regional Commission:
 Alternative Federal Co-Chairman
 Council of Economic Advisers:
 all members (2), except the Chairperson
 Corporation for National and Community Service:
 Managing directors (2)
 National Council on Disability:
 All members, including the Chairperson
 National Museum and Library Services Boards:
 all members
 National Science Foundation:
 all Board members
 Office of National Drug Control Policy:
 Deputy Directors
 Office of Navajo and Hopi Indian Relocation:
 Commissioner
 United States Agency for International Development (USAID):
 Assistant Administrator for Management
 Community Development Financial Institution Fund:
 Administrator
 Mississippi River Commission:
 all Commissioners (7)
 National Board for Education Sciences:
 all members (15)
 National Institute for Literacy Advisory Board:
 all members (10)
 Board of Trustees of the Institute of American Indian and Alaska Native Culture and Arts Development:
 all members (13)
 United States Public Health Service Commissioned Corps:
 all appointments and promotions (except Surgeon General)
 National Oceanic and Atmospheric Administration Commissioned Officer Corps:
 all appointments and promotions

The act also eliminated entirely the positions of Assistant Secretary of Defense for Networks and Information Integration and Assistant Secretary of Defense for Public Affairs.

See also
 Executive Schedule
 Number of United States political appointments by agency
 United States Government Policy and Supporting Positions

References

External links
 2008 United States Government Policy and Supporting Positions (Plum Book)
 Presidential Appointee Positions Requiring Senate Confirmation and Committees Handling Nominations - Updated March 18, 2008 - Congressional Research Service
 Presidential Appointee Positions Requiring Senate Confirmation and Committees Handling Nominations - November 15, 2012 - Congressional Research Service
 Presidential Appointee Initiative - Brookings Institution
 Presidential Appointment Efficiency and Streamlining Act of 2011

Executive branch of the government of the United States
Legislative branch of the United States government
 
Lists related to the United States Senate